Hemi-Vision is the third album by Canadian blues-rock band Big Sugar. The album was nominated for Best Rock Album at the 1997 Juno Awards.

The singles from the album were "Diggin' a Hole", "If I Had My Way", "Gone For Good" and " Up Baby". The band also recorded a French language version of " Up Baby", entitled "Ouvres-toi Bébé", for radio airplay in Quebec (see also Chauffe à bloc).

Background
The album was recorded in six weeks at Presence Studios and Phase One Studios. According to Gordie Johnson, this was the first album that the band had recorded with an adequate budget, having $65,000 Canadian at their disposal. Johnson collaborated with several other songwriters for this album. "Gone for Good", "Empty Head", and "If I Had My Way" were co-written with Patrick Ballantyne; "La Stralla" and "Skull King" with Andrew Whiteman; "Tired All The Time" with bandmate Kelly Hoppe; "Opem Up Baby" with Dan Gallagher; "Tommy Johnson" with Dave Wall; and "Diggin' a Hole" with Gallagher and Andy Curran.

25th Anniversary Deluxe Edition
On September 25, 2020, the band released a 25th anniversary deluxe edition of the album.

Track listing
 "Diggin' a Hole" – 4:37
 "Gone for Good" – 4:43
 "If I Had My Way" – 5:13
 "Skull Ring" – 4:25
 "Joe Louis / Judgement Day" – 8:58
 "Tommy Johnson" – 4:12
 "La Stralla" – 4:17
 "Tired All the Time" – 4:27
 "Empty Head" – 5:13
 " Up Baby"1 – 5:13
 "Rolling Pin" – 6:46
 "Tobacco Hand" – 8:55

2020 Deluxe Edition

13. "Gone for Good" (Early version)

14. "Gone for Good" (Lost take)

15. "Judgement Day" (Dub mix)

16. "Diggin' a Hole" (Acoustic version)

17. "Baby's in Black"

18. "Tommy Johnson" (Dub mix)

Personnel

Big Sugar
 Gordie Johnson - guitar, vocals, bass
 Kelly Hoppe - harmonica, keyboards
 Garry Lowe - bass
 Paul Brennan - drums

Guests
 Ashley MacIssac - fiddle
 Al Cross - drums
 Matt DeMatteo - drums

Notes
1 This track was labelled as " Up Baby" on the CD cover, although both the lyrics and the French version, titled "Ouvres-toi bébé", indicate that the intended meaning was "open". It is not known if this was a spelling error on the cover art or an intentional use of artistic license, but both "" and "Open" have been cited as the song's title by different reference works. The band's own website, however, uses the "" spelling, as does the 2003 greatest hits compilation Hit & Run, lending credence to the idea that it was intentional.

References

1996 albums
Big Sugar albums